Ana b'Koach (Hebrew: אנא בכוח) is a piyyut recited in many communities in the morning prayer after the Parshas HaKorbanot, and in as part of the Kabbalat Shabbat, as well as after the counting of the Omer which lasts seven weeks. The six letters (words) of each of the seven lines symbolize a day in the count, and the seventh day of the count is symbolized by the initials of the line spoken in that 'week' in those seven days of counting.

The source of the piyyut
The source of the piyyut is in the Middle Ages, probably in the Kabbalistic circles of Ashkenazi Hasidim. Some thought that it originated in the Tanna of Rabbi Nehunya ben HaKanah.

Rabbi Moshe Chaim Luzzatto (Ramchal) brings the prayer in his book 'Prayers for the Chariot' and incorporates it as part of his own longer piyyut, preceded by more than two hundred years by Rabbi Chaim Vital who mentions the piyyut several times, and Rabbi Avraham Azulai The Kabbalist Rabbi Shalom Sharabi wrote a commentary on the piyyut "Ana b'Koach" in the "Sefer Nehar Shalom".

Times of recitation of the piyyut
The piyyut is recited in many communities as part of the recitation of the sacrifices in the morning prayer, as well as at the Shabbat reception, before "Lekha Dodi."

In addition, it is the custom of the Hasidim to recite the piyyut in the laps of Simchat Torah, with one sentence recited in the order of each lap.
It is customary in some communities as well to say this during the "Tashlikh" ceremony on Rosh Hashanah or during the blowing of the Shofar, as well as in the hymns of the Hosanna, during the beating of the guarantee in the Hoshana Rabbah.

In some Hassidic communities, it every word is said seven times when lighting Hanukkah candles.

According to the Ari's custom (according to Rabbi Chaim Vital) it is customary to recite the entire piyyut before going to bed in the "recitation of Shema on the bed." In the piyyut there are seven lines, each line represents one day a week, twice.

References

External links
 14. Kabbalat Shabbat and Other Additions to the Prayers in Peninei Halakha by rabbi Eliezer Melamed
 Welcoming Shabbat with Ana B'koach by Merav Brenner and the Hallel Chorus

Hebrew words and phrases in Jewish law
Siddur of Orthodox Judaism